is a former Japanese football player and manager.

Playing career
Shimojo was born in Nagano Prefecture on May 10, 1954. After graduating from Waseda University, he played for Nissan Motors from 1978 to 1984.

Coaching career
After retirement, Shimojo became a coach at Nissan Motors (later Yokohama Marinos, Yokohama F. Marinos). In 1992, he became a manager for Nissan FC Ladies. In 1995, he became a coach for Yokohama Flügels. In 1996, he returned to Yokohama Marinos. He served as a coach and a team director until 2006. He also managed in 2001 and 2002.

Managerial statistics

References

External links

1954 births
Living people
Waseda University alumni
Association football people from Nagano Prefecture
Japanese footballers
Japan Soccer League players
Yokohama F. Marinos players
Japanese football managers
J1 League managers
Yokohama F. Marinos managers
Association football defenders